The disaster master or masters of disasters or variation, may refer to:

People
 DJ Master of Disaster (DJ MOD), a Philippine disc jockey, see DMC World DJ Championships
 Master of Disaster (wrestler), a pro-wrestler from NWL Tag Team Championship
 Master of Disaster (wrestler), a pro-wrestler from HoPWF Tag Team Championship
 The Master of Disaster (wrestler), a pro-wrestler from Smoky Mountain Wrestling, see List of former Smoky Mountain Wrestling personnel
 "Masters of Disaster", a moniker assigned to a pair of political operatives during the Clinton administration:
 Mark D. Fabiani (born 1957)
 Chris Lehane (born 1967)
 Irwin Allen (1916-1991), U.S. film producer nicknamed "Master of Disaster"
 Randall Bell, U.S. economist with the nickname "The Master of Disaster"
 Duane Peters (born 1961), U.S. punk rock musician nicknamed "The Master of Disaster"
 Jesse Robbins (born 1976), screen name "Master of Disaster", a U.S. technology entrepreneur
 Kim Stanley Robinson (born 1952), U.S. science fiction author nicknamed "The Master of Disaster"
 Samuel K. Skinner (born 1938), U.S. politician with the nickname "The Master of Disaster"
 JG Thirlwell (born 1960), Australian singer-songwriter nicknamed "Master of Disaster"
 Brandon Decker (born 1988), American artist and philosopher who maintains the persistent title of "Master of Disaster" across all organizations he has worked with.

Fictional characters
 "The Master of Disaster" (Rocky character), an epithet used by the Rocky franchise character Apollo Creed
 "Master of Disaster" (Hackers character), a screen name used by fictional character Joey Pardella from the 1995 film Hackers, see List of fictional hackers
 Masters of Disaster (comics), a DC Comics supervillain team

Film
 The Masters of Disaster (1986 film), a U.S. short documentary film
 Treasure Hunters (film) aka Master of Disaster; a 1981 Hong Kong kung-fu comedy Shaw Brothers Studio film
 New Killers in Town (1980 film) aka New Kids in Town aka Master of Disaster, a 1980 Hong Kong film starring actress Moon Lee

Music
 Master of Disaster (2005 album), a 2005 U.S. rock album by John Hiatt
 Master of Disaster (2001 record), a 2001 recording by German metal band Holy Moses
 Masters of Disaster (1986 record), a 1986 mixtape by The Icons from Green Monkey Records

Songs
 "Master of Disaster" (2011 song), a 2011 song by Seether off their 2011 album Holding Onto Strings Better Left to Fray
 "Master of Disaster" (2007 song), a 2007 song by U.D.O. off their 2007 album Mastercutor
 "Master Of Disaster" (2005 song), a 2005 song by Raging Speedhorn of their 2005 album How the Great Have Fallen

Television
 Disaster Masters (2005 UK TV series), a 2005-2009 BBC TV show about Homeserve, an insurance repair company
 Masters of Disaster (TV series), a 2019 Discovery Channel USA TV series about an Appalachian company that makes and acquires things for doomsday preppers

TV episodes
 "Disaster Master" (TV episode), 1981 season 1 episode 9 of The Richie Rich/Scooby-Doo Show
 "Masters of Disasters" (TV episode), 2009 season 2 episode 10 number 36 of Total Drama Action, see List of Total Drama Action episodes
 "Masters of Disaster" (TV episode), 2009 episode 9 of Top Chef Masters (season 1)
 "Masters of Disasters" (TV episode), 2015 season 3 episode 11 number 49 of TruTV Top Funniest
 "Master of Disaster" (TV episode), 2016 episode of Atomic Puppet
 "Masters of Disasters" (TV episode), 2017 season 8 episode 10 of Outrageous Acts of Science
 "Master of Disaster" (TV episode), 2017 season 3 episode 39 number 138 of Yu-Gi-Oh! Arc-V, see List of Yu-Gi-Oh! Arc-V episodes

Literature
 Masters of Disasters Mysteries, a mystery novel series by U.S. author Carole Marsh
 Moody: Master of Disaster (2015 book), a children's novel by U.S. author Megan McDonald
 Master of Disaster (2016 compilation), a 2016 omnibus comic book volume of Bart Simpsons comics, see List of The Simpsons comics
 Middle School: Master of Disaster (2020 book), a children's novel by Christopher Tebbets and James Patterson, see James Patterson bibliography

Other uses
 Masters of Disaster (airshow team), a U.S. aerobatics display team

See also

 Master Disaster (fictional character), a character from Transformers: Animated, see List of Transformers: Animated characters
 "Master & Disater" (TV episode), a 2005 season 3 episode 11 number 37 of Duck Dodgers, see List of Duck Dodgers episodes
 "The Master's Disaster" (TV episode), episode 49 from 2012 of Judge John Hodgman 
 
 
 
 Disaster (disambiguation)
 Master (disambiguation)